DP2 may refer to:
 British Rail DP2 a test locomotive built by English Electric
 Sigma DP2, a photographic camera
 Prostaglandin DP2 receptor
 Dance Praise 2: The ReMix, a 2007 video game
 Deadly Premonition 2: A Blessing in Disguise, a 2020 video game
 Deadpool 2, a 2018 film

See also
 
 DP (disambiguation)
 DPP (disambiguation)